Saint Mary Church of Chennai, constructed in 1712  and reconstructed in 1772, is one of the oldest churches of the Indian subcontinent, located in Chennai. It is famous for its belfry of six. The Church, also called the Armenian Church of Virgin Mary, is located on the Armenian Street in the neighbourhood of George Town.

Trevor Alexander was the caretaker of the Church until 2014; as on 2019, Jude Johnson, who is a relative of Trevor Alexander, is the care taker.

The Church

 Functioning only as a heritage site, the Church is opened for visitors from 9 am till 2:30 pm.
 It is funded by the Armenian Apostolic Church and maintained by The Armenian Church Committee in Calcutta.
 The graves of about 350 Armenians have been laid out throughout the Church.
 The founder, publisher and editor of the world's first Armenian periodical "Azdarar", Harutyun Shmavonyan, is buried here.
 The Belfry adjacent to the main Church structure houses six large bells which are rung every Sunday at 9:30 am by the caretaker.

The Armenians were a select group of merchants in Madras Presidency. They walked all the way from Armenia, through the Hindukush mountains and came down to Madras. When the British were trading cotton cloth, Armenians dealt with fine silk, expensive spices and gems.

Madras must have housed a small but a thriving Armenian population. Today there are none of them left.

Bells

The six bells are all of different sizes, varying from 21 to 26 inches, and weigh around 150 kg each, They are believed to be the largest and heaviest bells of Chennai. The bells were cast at different times as noted below:
One bell, with Armenian inscription dates to 1754. This was recast in 1808 and also bears Tamil inscription.
One bell's inscription indicates that it dates to 1778.
Inscriptions on two bells indicate that they were given to the Church in memory of 19 year Eliazar Shawmier, buried in the Church's garden. Shawmier was the youngest son of a leading Armenian merchant of the city of Madras (now Chennai) on whose private chapel ground the present Church stands.
The remaining two bells date to 1837 and were cast by the Whitechapel Bell Foundry, then known as Mears & Stainbank, with inscriptions reading "Thomas Mears, Founder, London".

Gallery

See also

Armenians in India
History of Chennai
George Town

References

External links

The bells of St. Mary’s
Website of the Armenian Holy Church of Nazareth, Kolkata Armenian Churches in India website

Armenian diaspora in India
Armenian Apostolic churches in India
Churches in Chennai
18th-century churches in India
18th-century Oriental Orthodox church buildings